Illicium floridanum (also known as purple anise, Florida anise, stink-bush, or star-anise) is an evergreen shrub native to the Gulf Coast area of the Southern United States, from Florida to Louisiana.

Description
The Florida anise tree has large evergreen lance shaped leaves that are lustrous and dark green. When crushed the leaf has a sweet odor, described as being "anise-like". The leaf of this plant has a parallel main vein. Within the leaf of this shrub, a flower also grows. The flower has 20 to 30 maroon-colored petals.  The petals are typically  in diameter. The flower is attractive, and it is often overlooked within the lush shiny foliage, but has a fish-like odor. If the flower is ripe, the seed explodes out of the star-shaped fruit. This plant has a variety that can be produced in cultivation through selective breeding. Depending on the breeding, white flowers can be observed.

Taxonomy
The Illicium floridanum plant was first discovered in 1765 by the servant of a man named William Clifton, Esq. of West Florida. It was first observed growing in a swamp near Pensacola. In 1766, King George III's botanist, John Bartram, found the Illicium flordianum plant on St. Johns River bank located in East Florida. He made a drawing of the plant, where he described the petals, leaves, and type of tree.

Distribution
This perennial plant is found in northern Florida and Georgia, as well as along the coastal plain toward Louisiana. The Illicium floridanum plant is endangered in Georgia.  This plant species  in those areas are known to be toxic. The Illicium floridanum shrub can be seen growing in wetlands, but can also be found in non-wetland areas. It grows in partial to fully shaded areas. However, it can survive in sunny areas, as long as it is being watered well. The soil for this plant should be moist, mulched and watered, especially during periods of dryness.

Uses
Illicium floridanum should not be ingested, and is not considered an alternative to a culinary spice. However, there is a similar species, the Chinese plant known as Illicium verum, which is used as a spice, and the oil of which is used in medicine and to flavor alcoholic beverages.

Etymology
Illicium is derived from Latin and means 'seductive'. The name is in reference to the plant's fragrance.

Floridanum means 'from Florida'.

References

floridanum
Flora of the Southeastern United States
Plants described in 1770